Didymiaceae is a family of plasmodial slime molds in the order Physarales.

Genera
The family contains the following four genera:
 Diderma
 Didymium
 Lepidoderma
 Mucilago

References

Amoebozoa families
Myxogastria